Tibetia is a monotypic genus of  cellar spiders containing the single species, Tibetia everesti. It was first described by F. Zhang, M. S. Zhu & D. X. Song in 2006, and is only found in Tibet.

See also
 List of Pholcidae species

References

Monotypic Araneomorphae genera
Pholcidae
Spiders of Asia